Harmologa toroterma is a species of moth of the family Tortricidae. It is found in New Zealand, where it has been recorded from the South Island.

References

Moths described in 1925
Archipini
Moths of New Zealand